Cameron Wilson may refer to:

Cameron Wilson (footballer) (born 2002), English footballer
Cameron Wilson (golfer) (born 1992), American golfer